Maxence Derrien (born 3 September 1993) is a French professional footballer who plays as a defensive midfielder or centre-back for Championnat National club Le Mans.

Career
On 21 June 2019, Derrien joined Ligue 2 club FC Chambly on a one-year contract. On 18 June 2021, he signed with Le Mans.

References

External links
Maxence Derrien at FC Chambly's website

1993 births
Living people
Association football defenders
French footballers
Ligue 2 players
Championnat National players
Championnat National 2 players
Championnat National 3 players
FC Lorient players
US Avranches players
Red Star F.C. players
FC Chambly Oise players
Le Mans FC players